The Kale (also Kalá, Valshanange) are a group of Romani people in Wales. Many claim to be descendants of Abram Wood, who was the first Rom to reside permanently and exclusively in Wales in the early 18th century, though Romanichal Travellers have appeared in Wales since the 16th century.

The Welsh Kale are extremely closely related to English Romanichal Travellers, Scottish Lowland Romany Travellers, Norwegian and Swedish Romanisæl Travellers and Finnish Kale.

Language
Originally the variants of Welsh Romani and the Angloromani of the Romanichal constituted a common "British Romani" language. Both Welsh Romani and Angloromani share characteristics and are closely related to each other and to Romani dialects spoken in Scotland (Scottish Cant), Finland (Finnish Kalo) and Norway and Sweden (Scandoromani). Welsh, English, Scottish, Swedish, Norwegian and Finnish Romani share common ancestry from a wave of Romani immigrants who came to England in the 16th century.

Integration into Welsh culture
While preserving their travelling lifestyle, the Kale grew to claim several aspects of Welsh culture, including the Welsh language, conversion to Christianity, taking on Welsh surnames, and participating in regional and national eisteddfodau. Notably, John Robert Lewis, the husband of Abram Wood's granddaughter, would win prizes for harping in 1842, 1848, and 1850.

Another descendant, John Roberts, earned the sobriquet "Telynor Cymru", and taught his whole family various instruments.  His illustrious career culminated in a performance before Queen Victoria at Palé Hall in Llandderfel near Bala on 24 August 1889, on the occasion of the Royal Visit to Wales. John Roberts played with his nine sons, all of them on the harp.

See also
Romanichal Travellers (English Travellers)
Romanisæl Travellers (Norwegian and Swedish Travellers)
Finnish Kale
Scottish Travellers
Irish Travellers

Notes

References
The Welsh Gypsies: Children of Abram Wood, Eldra Jarman, A. O. H. Jarman, University of Wales Press, 2011,

External links
Romani Cymru Project (Wales UK) - Archival Research initiative about Welsh Gypsy Culture

Ethnic groups in Wales
Romani groups
Romani in Wales
Welsh Romani people